The Ralt RT5 is an open-wheel formula race car, developed and built by Ralt in 1982, for the Formula Super Vee racing series, in 1980.

References

Open wheel racing cars